Pleasant Valley is an unincorporated community in Carroll County, Maryland, United States.
Pleasant Valley also has a Volunteer Fire Company, which hosts many county events throughout the year.

References

Unincorporated communities in Carroll County, Maryland
Unincorporated communities in Maryland